Wang Tao (born 28 October 1987) is a former Chinese footballer.

Career statistics

Club

Notes

References

1987 births
Living people
Chinese footballers
Association football defenders
Chinese Super League players
Shenzhen F.C. players